Royal Air Force Desborough or more simply RAF Desborough is a former Royal Air Force airfield located in Northamptonshire, England

History

The following units were here at some point:
 Satellite of No. 102 Flying Refresher School RAF (May - November 1951)
 No. 108 Gliding School RAF (September 1945 - June 1949)
 No. 84 Operational Training Unit RAF (September 1943 - June 1945)
 No. 1381 (Transport) Conversion Unit RAF (November 1945 - January 1947)

Current use

The site has reverted to farmland.

References

Citations

Bibliography

Desborough